Baltistani Society is one of the neighbourhoods of Jamshed Town in Karachi, Sindh, Pakistan.

There are several ethnic groups including Baltis, Muhajirs, Punjabis, Sindhis, Kashmiris, Seraikis, Pakhtuns, Balochis, Memons, Bohras Ismailis and Christians.

References

External links 
 Karachi Website.

Neighbourhoods of Karachi
Jamshed Town